Sceloporus chrysostictus, the yellow-spotted spiny lizard or Yucatán spiny lizard, is a species of phrynosomatid lizard.

Geographic range
It is most commonly found in the Yucatán Peninsula. It also ranges through Guatemala and Northern Belize.

References 

 Cope, E.D. 1866. Fourth contribution to the herpetology of tropical America. Proc. Acad. Nat. Sci. Phila. 18:123-132.

Sceloporus
Reptiles of Belize
Reptiles of Guatemala
Reptiles of Mexico
Reptiles described in 1866
Taxa named by Edward Drinker Cope